Pseudochapsa is a genus of lichen-forming fungi in the family Graphidaceae. It has 19 species. It was circumscribed in 2012 by Sittiporn Parnmen, Robert Lücking, and Helge Thorsten Lumbsch, with Pseudochapsa dilatata as the type species. Pseudochapsa differs from Chapsa (the genus from which it was segregated) it that its excipulum (the rim of tissue around the apothecia) is typically brown. Additionally, its ascospores are mostly discoseptate and amyloid. The generic name combines the Greek pseudo ("false") with the genus name Chapsa.

Species
Pseudochapsa albomaculata 
Pseudochapsa amylospora 
Pseudochapsa aptrootiana 
Pseudochapsa crispata 
Pseudochapsa dilatata 
Pseudochapsa esslingeri 
Pseudochapsa isidiifera 
Pseudochapsa kalbii 
Pseudochapsa lueckingii 
Pseudochapsa phlyctidea 
Pseudochapsa phlyctidioides 
Pseudochapsa pseudoexanthismocarpa 
Pseudochapsa pseudoschizostoma 
Pseudochapsa rhizophorae 
Pseudochapsa rivas-platae 
Pseudochapsa sipmanii 
Pseudochapsa subdactylifera 
Pseudochapsa subpatens

References

Graphidaceae
Lecanoromycetes genera
Lichen genera
Taxa described in 2012
Taxa named by Robert Lücking
Taxa named by Helge Thorsten Lumbsch